Dr. Hodigere Shanbhog Venkateshamurthy(born 23 June 1944), often referred to by his initials, HSV, is an Indian film director, professor, essayist, playwright, novelist, childrens literature, translator, critic and poet works in Kannada Literature and Kannada Cinema.

Murthy was born to Nagarathnamma and Narayana Bhatta in the remote village of Hodigere, Channagiri Taluk, Shimoga District. After attending school in his native village, he studied in Holalkere followed by collegiate training at Chitradurga. He completed his master's degree in Kannada at Central College Bangalore. He worked as lecturer and professor for more than three decades at St. Joseph's College of Commerce, Bangalore, and remained in Bangalore after retirement. He received his Doctorate of Literature for his research on Kannadadalli Kathana Kavanagalu.

Literary career
Murthy is a post-navya writer and Bhavageete poet. His works blend the pre-navya and post-navya literary movements. As of 2020, he has published more than 100 books in Kannada.

Contributions to film 
 Balondu Bhavageethe: "Kamana Billina mele" (song)
 Chinnari Mutta: Story, dialogue and all songs
 Kotreshi Kanasu: All songs
 America America: "Banalli Telo moda" (song)
 Kraurya: Dialogue
 Mythri: Song
 Kirik Party: "Thoogu Manchadalli Koothu" (song)

Contributions to television 
 Mukta: Title song
 Maha Parva: Title

Awards
 Bala Puraskar Award from Central Sahitya Academy, India (2013)
 V.M. Inamdar Memorial Award for his book Kumaravyasa Kathanthara
 Filmfare Award for Best Lyricist – Kannada at the 66th Filmfare Awards South for his work on Hasiru Ribbon

References

20th-century Indian dramatists and playwrights
Kannada poets
Indian male dramatists and playwrights
People from Shimoga district
Kannada-language writers
Indian male poets
1944 births
Living people
Poets from Karnataka
Dramatists and playwrights from Karnataka
20th-century Indian male writers
Recipients of the Rajyotsava Award 2003
Recipients of the Sahitya Akademi Prize for Translation